The 2022 United States Senate election in Idaho was held on November 8, 2022 to elect a member of the United States Senate to represent the state of Idaho.

Incumbent Republican Senator Mike Crapo was first elected in 1998 and ran for reelection to a fifth term in office. Primary elections were held on May 17, 2022. Crapo easily won renomination, while former Idaho House of Representatives candidate David Roth won the Democratic primary with 57.8% of the vote. Crapo ultimately won the election.

Republican primary

Candidates

Nominee
Mike Crapo, incumbent U.S. Senator

Eliminated in primary
Brenda Bourn
Natalie Fleming, independent candidate for Idaho's 1st congressional district in 2018 and U.S. Senate in 2020
Scott Trotter, business owner
Ramont Turnbull, development manager

Failed to file
Mike Little, Iraq War veteran

Withdrawn 
Jeremy Gilbert, law firm operations director and U.S. Army veteran

Endorsements

Results

Democratic primary

Candidates

Nominee
David Roth, nominee for state representative from the 33rd district in 2020

Eliminated in primary
Ben Pursley, real estate developer

Results

Libertarian primary

Candidates

Nominee
Idaho Sierra Law, environmental activist and perennial candidate

Results

Constitution primary

Candidates

Nominee
Ray Writz, nominee for U.S. Senate in 2016 and 2020

Results

Independents

Candidates

Declared
Scott Cleveland, entrepreneur

General election

Predictions

Endorsements

Debates

Results

By congressional district
Crapo won both congressional districts.

See also 
 2022 United States Senate elections
 2022 Idaho elections

Notes

References

External links 
Official campaign websites
 Scott Cleveland (I) for Senate
 Mike Crapo (R) for Senate
 David Roth (D) for Senate

2022
Idaho
United States Senate